Kory C. Casto (born December 8, 1981) is a former Major League Baseball player. Casto began his career with the Washington Nationals. He made his Major League debut April 3, in a game against the Florida Marlins.

On January 14, 2010, Casto signed a minor league contract with an invite to spring training with the Detroit Tigers. Casto was released by Detroit following spring training. In May 2010, Casto was signed by the Arizona Diamondbacks to a minor league contract. On July 31, 2010, Casto voluntarily retired.

Casto went to high school at North Marion High School in Aurora, OR.

References

External links

1981 births
Living people
Sportspeople from Salem, Oregon
Baseball players from Oregon
Major League Baseball outfielders
Major League Baseball infielders
Portland Pilots baseball players
Vermont Expos players
Harrisburg Senators players
Columbus Clippers players
Washington Nationals players
Águilas Cibaeñas players
American expatriate baseball players in the Dominican Republic
Peoria Javelinas players